The 1997 Division Two Championship season was the third tier of British rugby league during the 1997 season.

Championship
The league was won by Hunslet Hawks, winning promotion to Division One along with Rochdale Hornets and Leigh Centurions.

League table

See also
Super League war
1997 Challenge Cup

References

External links

1997 season at wigan.rlfans.com

RFL League 1
RFL Division Two